Krishna and His Leela is a 2020 Indian Telugu-language romantic comedy film directed by Ravikanth Perepu who co-wrote and co-edited the film with Siddu Jonnalagadda. The film is produced by Suresh Productions and Viacom18 Studios. It stars Jonnalagadda, Shraddha Srinath, Seerat Kapoor and Shalini Vadnikatti. This is Perepu's second film after Kshanam (2016). The music was composed by Sricharan Pakala. The cinematography for the film was handled jointly by Shaneil Deo and Sai Prakash U, whereas Garry BH served as one of the editors. The film was released directly on Netflix on 25 June 2020 globally.

Plot 
In Vizag, Sathya breaks up with Krishna and moves to Bangalore. After going through a phase of depression, Krishna decides to move on and meets Radha, and they begin dating. Krishna receives a job offer in an IT firm in Bangalore, and leaves after deciding to maintain a long-distance relationship with Radha.

In Bangalore, Krishna meets his sister Arya’s roommate Rukhsar, and forms a close friendship with her. He also meets and reconnects with Sathya, and tells Radha about his friendship with Sathya. Radha arrives in Bangalore a fortnight later, and they all take a vacation to Coorg. After returning to Bangalore, Radha leaves back to Vizag. Over the next few weeks Krishna and Sathya get closer, and the former begins to drift apart from Radha. This leads to their eventual breakup. One night, while spending the night with Sathya, Krishna ends up sleeping with her, and they reconcile, starting a relationship again.

However, Radha returns to Bangalore, telling Krishna she became pregnant after their trip to Coorg, but was able to take contraceptives in time. A guilt-ridden Krishna lies to Radha that he is not in touch with Sathya, and reconciles with her, simultaneously dating the two girls. Arya’s marriage is fixed, and despite Krishna’s reluctance, their estranged father is invited to the wedding. During the wedding, Krishna struggles to manage Sathya and Radha, fabricating several lies, and his plight is understood by his father. The latter advices Krishna to be practical and make a choice between the two girls, a mistake he himself had committed during Krishna’s childhood. Krishna pays heed to the advice and confesses to the two girls that he has been cheating on them, and they both leave him.

On Rukhsar’s advice, Krishna takes a road-trip and writes a book about his misadventures with Sathya and Radha, and publishes the book under the title Krishna and His Leela. The book is a success, and during a meet and greet, reveals that he maintains a good friendship with the two girls, Radha having settled abroad and Sathya getting married the following month. At an after-party following the marriage, Krishna approaches Rukhsar and asks her to marry him, to which she looks back in shock.

Cast 

 Siddu Jonnalagadda as Krishna
 Shraddha Srinath as Sathya Rao
 Seerat Kapoor as Rukhsar
 Shalini Vadnikatti as Radha Panicker
 Viva Harsha as Harsha, Krishna's friend
 Jhansi as Geetha, Krishna's mother
 Sampath Raj as Krishna's father
 Samyukta Hornad as Arya, Krishna's sister
 Raj Madiraju as Radha's father
 Poojan Kohli as Poojan
 Sricharan Pakala as Krishna's friend
 Eugeni Austinova as Harsha's girlfriend

Production 
In March 2017, Rana Daggubati was reported to collaborate with Ravikanth Perepu (of Kshanam fame), by presenting his upcoming project. Rana decided to present the project after  Perepu narrated the script to the former and got impressed with the storyline, although the details were undeciphered. In May 2017, it was reported that Shraddha Srinath and Seerat Kapoor will play the female leads, opposite Siddhu Jonnalagada (of Guntur Talkies fame) as the protagonist. While no details were revealed about the project, on August 2019, the makers announced the film's title as Krishna and His Leela, and the makers also wrapped the shoot in Kashmir.

Soundtrack 

The music is composed by Sricharan Pakala with lyrics written by Pakala, Kittu Vissapragada, Pranav Chaganty, Rohit Roe Pediredla, Murtuza Abbas Qurasani, Ananth Srikar and Vedala Hemachandra.

Release 
Krishna and His Leela was scheduled for a theatrical release on 1 May 2020, but due to the COVID-19 pandemic the makers opted for a direct digital release on Netflix, from 25 June 2020 and later released on Aha from 4 July 2020.

Reception 
Baradwaj Rangan of Film Companion South wrote "Krishna And His Leela never rises above “casual” and “breezy”: it doesn’t sting. But that’s not really a deal-breaker. But What’s interesting in these “new-gen” movies — especially in the context of Telugu cinema — is how interestingly, how consistently the women are written." Sangeetha Devi Dundoo of The Hindu reviewed "The film navigates tricky corners of confused relationships with humour". Shubhra Gupta of The Indian Express gave two-and-a-half out of five and wrote "There’s a thin line between comedy and drama and you’re walking on that line now, says a character to another. The film manages to walk that line, wobbling occasionally but straightening out in time."

Haricharan Pudipeddi of Hindustan Times stated "Even though it starts out as a slightly cheesy take on modern romance, it takes a refreshing turn as the story progresses, quite boldly crushing many mainstream stereotypes associated with the representation of love and marriage. For its unadulterated, unabashed take on urban romance, the film deserves a lot of praise and love." Janani K. of India Today gave three-and-a-half out of five, saying "Krishna and his Leela is a film that showcases the life of youngsters and their stability when it comes to relationships". Sowmya Rajendran of The News Minute gave three stars and wrote "The film more or less follows the pattern of movies with philandering heroes but with some refreshing departures [...] What the film does best is to explore contemporary relationships, with independent partners who have ambitions of their own and things are more fluid and flexible than they were a generation ago. The music, styling, and the camera, focusing closely on the characters' subtle expressions and the unfolding drama, offer an urban experience on screen that's rarely witnessed."

A critic from 123Telugu gave three stars and stated "Krishna and his Leela is a typical romantic comedy that showcases the mindset of today’s youth when it comes to stability in love". Sify gave two-and-a-half out of five stating "‘Krishna and His Leela’ is contemporary rom-com of a confused youngster but this film is more like adding coolness to ‘cheating’ in relationships". Sudhir Srinivasan of The New Indian Express wrote "Krishna and His Leela is a film whose characters and situations bring out enough complexity without its lead character having to look into the camera and ask why it’s wrong to be in love with two women at the same time."

References

External links
 
 

Indian direct-to-video films
2020 direct-to-video films
2020 films
Viacom18 Studios films
2020s Telugu-language films
Hinduism in pop culture-related controversies
Indian romantic comedy films
Films scored by Sricharan Pakala
2020 romantic comedy films
Aha (streaming service) original films
Telugu-language Netflix original films